Van Vliet is a toponymic surname of Dutch origin. The original bearer may have lived or worked near a vliet, a Dutch term for a minor stream. The name is quite common in the Netherlands, ranking  40th in 2007 (16,903 people). Variations include Van de Vliet and Van der Vliet. People with this surname include:

 (born 1951), Dutch mayor
Andy Van Vliet (born 1995), Belgian basketball player for Bnei Herzliya Basket in the Israeli Basketball Premier League
Arie van Vliet (1916–2001), Dutch Olympic cycler
Carolyne Van Vliet (1929–2016), Dutch-born American physicist
Claire Van Vliet (born 1933), Canadian painter, illustrator and typographer 
Chris Van Vliet (born 1983), Canadian television personality 
Don Van Vliet (1941–2010), better known as Captain Beefheart, American musician and painter
Eddy van Vliet (1942–2002), Belgian writer and lawyer
Gerard van Vliet (born 1964), Aruban cyclist
Hanna van Vliet (born 1992), Dutch actress
Hanpeter van Vliet (1962–1996), Dutch software engineer
Hans van Vliet (born 1949), Dutch computer scientist
Hans van Vliet (born 1976), better known as Hunz, Australian electronic pop musician
Hendrick Cornelisz van Vliet (1611–1675), Dutch painter
Jan van Vliet (1622–1666), Dutch philologist
Jan Gillisz van Vliet (1605–1668), Dutch painter
Jeremias van Vliet (1602–1663), Dutch East India Company director and historian in Thailand
 (born 1965), Dutch jazz pianist 
 (1914–2000), United States Army commander and POW known for the Van Vliet Report
Krystyn Van Vliet, American engineer
Leo van Vliet (born 1955), Dutch racing cyclist
Louis van Vliet (1854–1932), Dutch chess master
Lyman Van Vliet (born ca. 1927), American inventor of Shoe Goo
Marcel van Vliet (born 1970), Dutch truck racer
Marjorie van Vliet (1923–1990), American aviator
Maury Van Vliet (1913–2001), Canadian physical education academic
Nel van Vliet (1926–2006), Dutch swimmer
 (born 1935), Dutch cabaretier and UNICEF Goodwill Ambassador
Peter Van Vliet (fl. 1841–1851), American farmer and politician
Robert Campbell Van Vliet (1857–1943), United States Army commander 
Roland van Vliet (born 1969), Dutch politician
Stefanie van Vliet (born 1967), Dutch politician
Stewart Van Vliet (1815–1901), Union general of the American Civil War
Teun van Vliet (born 1962), Dutch road cyclist
Tony Van Vliet (American politician) (born 1930), American politician
Tony Van Vliet (Australian politician) (1933–1982), Australian politician
Willem van Vliet (born 1952), Dutch sociologist

Van de(r) Vliet
Albert Van de Vliet (born 1917), Belgian Olympic canoeist
Cornelis van der Vliet (1880–1960), Dutch sports shooter
Henk van der Vliet (born 1928), Dutch flutist and composer
Jan van der Vliet (born 1949), Dutch rower
Patricia van der Vliet (born 1989), Dutch fashion model
Wiebe van der Vliet (born 1970), Dutch film editor
Willem van der Vliet (ca. 1584–1642), Dutch Golden Age painter

Fan-der-Flit, Russian noble merchant family

See also
 Vliet (disambiguation)

References

Dutch-language surnames
Surnames of Dutch origin